This is a list of notable Danish people.

Actors

 Ellen Aggerholm (1882–1963), stage and screen actress 
 Ane Grethe Antonsen (1855–1930), actress
 Anna Bård (1980–), model, actress
 Gry Bay (1974–), actress
 Rasmus Bjerg (1976–), actor
 Anna Bloch (1868–1953), actress
 Lars Bom (1961–), actor
 Charlotte Bournonville (1832–1911), actress and opera singer 
 Johanne Brun (1874–1954), opera singer
 Hans Egede Budtz (1889–1968), actor
 Poul Bundgaard, actor
 Jesper Christensen, actor
 Nikolaj Coster-Waldau, actor
 Karl Dane (1886–1934), silent film actor, comedian
 Mille Dinesen (1974–), actress
 Uffe Ellemann-Jensen, Minister of Foreign Affairs and President of the European Liberals (ALDE)
 Olaf Fønss (1882–1949), silent film actor
 Morten Grunwald, actor
 Ruth Guldbæk (1919–2006), opera singer
 John Hahn-Petersen, actor
 Caroline Halle-Müller (1755–1826), actor, singer and dancer
 Holger Juul Hansen
 Betty Hennings (1850–1939), actress, famous for her roles in Ibsen's plays
 Jean Hersholt (1886–1956), film actor (Academy Awards Jean Hersholt Humanitarian Award)
 Iben Hjejle (1971–), actress
 Astrid Holm (1893–1961), actress
 Gudrun Houlberg (1889–1940), actress
 Inge Hvid-Møller (1912–1970), actress and theatre director
 Allan Hyde (1989–), actor 
 Bodil Ipsen (1889–1964), actress
 Katja K (1968–), ex-adult performer, actor
 Tina Kiberg (1958–), opera singer
 Lone Koppel (1938–), opera singer
 Nikita Klæstrup (1994–), political commentator, model, reality TV star
 Nikolaj Lie Kaas, actor
 Bodil Kjer (1917–2003), actress
 Makka Kleist (born 1951), Greenlandic actress
 Brigitte Kolerus (1941–2001), actress and theatre director
 Tenna Kraft (1885–1954), opera singer
 Johanne Krarup-Hansen (1870–1958), opera singer
 Lilly Lamprecht (1887–1976), opera singer
 Dorothy Larsen (1911–1990), opera singer
 Lau Lauritzen Jr. (1910–1977), director, actor, producer
 Thure Lindhardt (1974–), actor
 Julie Lund (1979–), actress
 Augusta Lütken (1855–1910), opera singer
 Mia Lyhne (1971–), film and television actress
 Anders Matthesen, actor, comedian
 Svend Melsing, actor, playwright
 Svend Methling, actor
 Mads Mikkelsen (1965–), actor
 Lars Mikkelsen (1964–), actor
 Viggo Mortensen (1958–), actor (half Danish)
 Sigrid Neiiendam (1873–1955), actress
 Birthe Neumann (1947–), actress at the Royal Danish Theatre
 Asta Nielsen (1883–1972), silent film star, actress
 Brigitte Nielsen (1963–), actress, former wife of Sylvester Stallone
 Connie Nielsen (1965–), film actress
 Oda Nielsen (1851–1936), actress in Copenhagen theatres 
 Ghita Nørby (1935–), film actress 
 Jens Okking, actor
 Kirsten Olesen (1949–), actress
 Dagmar Orlamundt (1863–1939), comic actress
 Elna Panduro (1882–1983), actress, operetta singer
 Dirch Passer, actor
 Johanne Pedersen-Dan (1860–1934), actress and operetta singer
 Ulf Pilgaard, actor
 Søren Pilmark, actor
 Clara Pontoppidan (1883–1975), actress
 Valdemar Psilander (1884–1917), silent film star
 Poul Reichhardt, actor
 Asbjørn Riis, actor, professional wrestler
 Kirsten Rolffes, actress
 Lisbeth Cathrine Amalie Rose (1738–1793), actress
 Louise Sahlgreen (1818–1891), opera singer
 Emilie Sannom (1886–1931), actress and stunt woman
 Johanne Louise Schmidt (1983–), actress
 Jonas Schmidt, actor
 Ib Schønberg, actor
 Clara Schønfeld (1856–1938), actress
 Else Schøtt (1895–1989), opera singer
 Ingeborg Skov (1893–1990), actress
 Lis Smed (1914–1944), actress
 Ingeborg Spangsfeldt (1895–1968), early film actress
 Ove Sprogøe, actor
 Paprika Steen (1964–), film actress and director
 Karl Stegger, actor
 Ingeborg Steffensen (1888–1964), opera singer
 Inger Stender (1912–1989), stage, film and television actress
 Yutte Stensgaard (1946–), film and television actress
 Ebba Thomsen (1887–1973), silent movie actor
 Emma Thomsen (1863–1910), actress
 Ulrich Thomsen, actor
 Sven-Ole Thorsen, actor
 Soffy Walleen (1861–1940), actress
 Lilian Weber Hansen (1911–1987), opera singer
 Charlotte Wiehe-Berény (1865–1947), ballet dancer and actress
 Viggo Wiehe, actor
 Carlo Wieth, actor
 Ebba Wilton (1896–1951), opera singer
 Lulu Ziegler (1903–1973), actress, singer and theatre director
 Marie Zinck (1789–1823), actress and opera singer

Archaeologists
 Frans Blom (1893–1963)
 Peter Oluf Brøndsted (1780–1842), classic archaeologist
 Peter Glob (1911–1985)
 Erik Holtved (1899–1981), Greenland
 Sanne Houby-Nielsen (1960–), Danish-Swedish archaeologist and museum director
 Lis Jacobsen (1882–1961), philologist, runologist
 Eigil Knuth (1903–1996), Greenland 
 Therkel Mathiassen (1892–1967), Arctic
 Christian Jürgensen Thomsen (1788–1865), archaeologist
 Jens Jacob Asmussen Worsaae (1821–1885), archaeologist, historian and politician

Architects and designers

 Rigmor Andersen (1903–1995), furniture designer
 Axel Berg (1856–1929), architect
 Antoine de Bosc de la Calmette (1752–1803), landscape architect
 Ellen Braae (1965–), landscape architect 
 Karen Clemmensen (1917–2001), architect
 Sophy A. Christensen (1867–1893), furniture designer
 Vilhelm Dahlerup (1826–1907), architect
 Knud V. Engelhardt (1882–1931), designer
 Inger Exner (1926–), architect
 Johannes Exner (1926–2015), architect
 Jørgen Gammelgaard (1938–1991), furniture designer
 Jan Gehl (1947–), architect, urban planner
 Kaj Gottlob (1887–1976), architect and furniture designer
 Ragna Grubb (1903–1961), architect
 Andreas Hallander (1755–1828), Golden Age architect
 Christina Liljenberg Halstrøm (1977–), furniture designer
 Christian Frederik Hansen (1756–1845), architect
 Christian Hansen (1803–1883), architect active mainly in Athens and Copenhagen
 Erik Hansen (1927–2016), architect
 Theophilus Hansen (1813–1891), architect active in Athens and Vienna
 Caspar Frederik Harsdorff (1735–1799), Golden Age architect
 Malene Hauxner (1942–), architect
 Piet Hein (1905–1996)
 Poul Henningsen (1894–1967), author, architect, designer
 Peter Hvidt (1916–1986), architect and furniture designer
 Anna Maria Indrio (1943–), architect
 Bjarke Ingels (1974–), architect
 Andreas Jeppe Iversen (1888–1979), furniture designer
 Arne Jacobsen (1902–1971), architect
 Grete Jalk (1920–2006), furniture designer
 Georg Jensen (1866–1935), silversmith, designer
 Jacob Jensen (1926–2015), designer
 Jens Jensen (1860–1951), landscape architect
 Timothy Jacob Jensen (1962–), designer
 Finn Juhl (1912–1989)
 Jørgen Kastholm (1938–2007), furniture designer
 Bodil Kjær (1932–), architect and furniture designer
 Jacob Kjær (1896–1957), furniture designer
 Hanne Kjærholm (1930–2009), architect
 Jens Christian Kofoed (1864–1941), architect
 Eva Koppel (1916–2006), architect
 Mette Lange (graduated 1990), architect, mobile schools for India
 Henning Larsen, architect
 Mogens Lassen (1901–1987), architect
 Vilhelm Lauritzen (1894–1984), architect and furniture designer
 Marie Gudme Leth (1895–1997), textile designer
 Aksel Bender Madsen (1916–2000), furniture designer
 Anne Sofie Madsen (1979–), fashion designer
 Dorte Mandrup-Poulsen (1961–), architect
 Ferdinand Meldahl (1827–1908), architect
 Børge Mogensen (1914–1972), designer
 Orla Mølgaard-Nielsen (1907–1993), architect and furniture designer
 Elna Møller (1913–1994), principal editor of Danmarks Kirker
 Hans Olsen (1919–1992), furniture designer
 Johan Martin Quist (1755–1818), Golden Age architect
 Søren Rasmussen (1954–), architect, designer
 Steen Eiler Rasmussen (1898–1990), architect
 Lise Roel (1928–), architect
 Rudolph Rothe (1802–1877), landscape architect
 Kasper Salto (1957–), designer
 Jens Martin Skibsted (1970–), designer
 Lene Tranberg (1956–), architect, co-founder of Lundgaard & Tranberg
 Susanne Ussing (1940–1998), architect
 Jan Utzon (1944–), architect
 Jørn Utzon (1918–2008), architect, Sydney Opera House
 Kim Utzon (1957–), architect
 Henrik Valeur (1966–), architect
 Gertrud Vasegaard (1913–2007), ceramist
 Arne Vodder (1926–2009), furniture designer and architect
 Vilhelm Theodor Walther (1819–1892), architect
 Hans J. Wegner (1914–2007), designer
 Lone Wiggers (1963–), architect
 Vilhelm Wohlert (1920–2007), architect, Louisiana Museum of Modern Art
 Kurt Østervig (1912–1986), furniture designer

Artists

 Nikolaj Abraham Abildgaard (1744–1809), painter
 Else Alfelt (1910–1974), painter
 Merete Barker (1944–), painter
 Wilhelm Bendz (1804–1832), painter
 Albert Bertelsen (1921–2019), painter
 Ejler Bille (1910–2004), painter
 Johanne Bindesbøll (1851–1934), textile artist 
 Herman Wilhelm Bissen (1798–1868), sculptor
 Lars Bo (1924–1999), etcher
 Jørgen Boberg (1940–2009), painter
 Kay Bojesen (1886–1958), silversmith, designer
 Peter Brandes (1944–), painter, sculptor and ceramic artist
 Thorald Brendstrup (1812–1883), painter
 Anders Bundgaard (1864–1937), sculptor
 Emil Bærentzen (1799–1868), painter and lithographer
 Anne Marie Carl-Nielsen (1863–1945), sculptor
 Johannes Carstensen (1924–2010), painter, stained glass artist
 Poul Simon Christiansen (1855–1933), painter
 Ingvar Cronhammar (1947–), Swedish-born sculptor
 Carl Dahl (1812–1865), painter
 Kirsten Dehlholm (1945–), scenic artist
 Heinrich Dohm (1875–1940), painter
 Anton Dorph (1831–1914), painter
 Christoffer Wilhelm Eckersberg, painter
 Heinrich Eddelien (1802–1852), painter
 Gottfred Eickhoff (1902–1982)
 Olafur Eliasson, sculptor, installation, photography; is Icelandic–Danish, considered one of the most famous Icelandic artists, in Iceland written Ólafur Elíasson
 Michael Elmgreen (1961–), installations
 Lisa Engqvist (1914–1989), ceramist
 Gutte Eriksen (1918–2008), ceramist
 Adam Fischer (1888–1968), sculptor
 Wilhelm Freddie (1909–1995), painter
 Ingeborg Frederiksen (1886–1976), painter and botanical illustrator
 Hermann Ernst Freund (1786–1840), sculptor
 Paul Gadegaard (1920–1996), painter and sculptor
 Ib Geertsen (1919–2009), painter and sculptor
 Albert Gottschalk (1866–1906), painter
 Hans Jørgen Hammer (1815–1882), painter
 Svend Hammershøi (1873–1948), painter and ceramist
 Vilhelm Hammershøi (1864–1916), painter
 Karen Hannover (1872–1943), ceramist
 Aksel Hansen, sculptor
 Constantin Hansen (1804–1880), painter
 Heinrich Hansen (1821–1890), painter
 Johannes Hansen (1903–1995), sculptor
 Peter Hansen (1868–1928), painter
 Karl Hansen Reistrup (1863–1929), sculptor, ceramist, illustrator
 Arne Haugen Sørensen (1932–), painter, illustrator and church decorator
 Jørgen Haugen Sørensen (1934–), sculptor
 Sven Havsteen-Mikkelsen (1912–1999), painter, illustrator and church decorator
 Henry Heerup (1907–1993), painter
 Einar Hein (1875–1931), painter
 Jeppe Hein (1974–), installations
 Gerhard Henning (1880–1967), sculptor
 Frants Henningsen (1850–1908), artist
 Jacob Holdt (1947–), photographer, writer
 Hans Holst (born before 1619, died after 1640), woodcarver
 Johannes Holt-Iversen (1989–), painter
 Paul Høm (1905–1994), artist and church decorator
 Horder (12th century), stonemason and sculptor
 Knud Hvidberg (1927–1986), painter and sculptor
 Peter Ilsted (1861–1933), painter/etcher
 Valdemar Irminger (1850–1938), painter
 Robert Jacobsen (1912–1993), sculptor and painter
 Ville Jais-Nielsen (1886–1949), painter
 Axel P. Jensen (1885–1972), painter
 Johan Laurentz Jensen (1800–1856), painter
 Jens Adolf Jerichau (1818–1883), sculptor
 Svend Johansen (1890–1970), painter, scenographer
 Viggo Johansen (1851–1935), painter
 Lorentz Jørgensen (1644–1681), woodcarver
 Asger Jorn (1914–1973), painter
 Jens Juel (1745–1802), painter mainly known for portraits
 Bodil Kaalund (1930–2016), painter, textile artist, church decorator
 Herman A. Kähler (1846–1917), ceramist
 Per Kirkeby (1938–), painter
 Anna Klindt Sørensen (1899–1985), painter
 Jesper Knudsen (1964–), painter
 Eva Koch (1953–), sculptor
 Kristiane Konstantin-Hansen (1848–1925), textile artist 
 John Kørner (1967–), painter
 Theodora Krarup (1862–1941), portrait painter
 Nathalie Krebs (1895–1978), potter
 Pietro Krohn (1840–1905), painter, illustrator 
 Peder Severin Krøyer (1851–1909), painter
 Christen Købke (1810–1848), painter
 Michael Kvium (1955–), painter
 La Norma Fox (born 1926), trapeze artist
 Poul Lange graphic designer, artist, photographer
 Alhed Larsen (1872–1927), painter
 Emanuel Larsen (1823–1859), painter
 Johannes Larsen (1867–1961), painter
 Harald Leth (1899–1986), painter
 Kirsten Lockenwitz (1932–), painter and sculptor
 Christian August Lorentzen (1749–1828), painter
 Frederik Christian Lund (1826–1901), painter
 Vilhelm Lundstrøm (1893–1950), painter
 Julie Lütken (1788–1816), painter
 Christine Løvmand (1803–1872), painter
 Jais Nielsen (1885–1961), painter and ceramist
 Karl Madsen (1855–1938), painter and art historian
 Wilhelm Marstrand (1810–1873), painter
 Brix Michgell (early 17th century), sculptor, woodworker 
 Mogens Møller (1934–), painter and sculptor
 Moritz Georg Moshack (1730–before 1772), clavichord builder
 Richard Mortensen (1910–1993), painter
 Adam August Müller (1811–1844), painter
 Christian Mølsted (1862–1930), painter
 Rasmus Nellemann (1923–2004), painter and illustrator 
 Knud Nellemose (1908–1997), sculptor
 Anders Nielsen Hatt (early 17th century), sculptor, woodworker
 Elsa Nielsen (1923–2011), graphic artist
 Kai Nielsen (1882–1924), sculptor
 Palle Nielsen (1923–2000), graphic artist
 Thorvald Niss (1842–1905), painter
 Astrid Noack (1888–1954), sculptor
 Emil Normann (1798–1881)
 Dagmar Olrik (1860–1932), painter and tapestry artist
 John Olsen (1938–), painter, sculptor
 Willy Ørskov (1920–1990), sculptor
 Erik Ortvad (1917–2008), painter
 Carl-Henning Pedersen, painter
 Axel Poulsen (1887–1972), sculptor
 Tal R (1967–), painter
 Anu Ramdas (1980–), interdisciplinary artist
 Svend Rathsack (1885–1941), sculptor
 Jytte Rex (1942–), painter, writer, filmmaker
 Jørgen Ringnis (?–1652), woodcarver
 Elof Risebye (1892–1961), painter, church decorator
 Martinus Rørbye (1803–1848), painter
 Arild Rosenkrantz (1870–1964), painter, stained glass artist, sculptor and illustrator
 William Scharff (1886–1959), painter
 Abel Schrøder the Younger (1602–1676), woodcarver
 Hans Smidth (1839–1917), painter
 Povl Søndergaard (1905–1986), sculptor
 Karen Strand (1924–2000), goldsmith
 Jakob Martin Strid (1972–), cartoonist
 Kamma Svensson (1908–1998), illustrator
 Christine Swane (1876–1960), painter
 Sigurd Swane (1879–1973), painter
 Anna Syberg (1870–1914), painter
 Fritz Syberg (1862–1939), painter and illustrator
 Carl Frederik Sørensen (1818–1879)
 Carl Thomsen (1847–1912), painter and illustrator
 Bertel Thorvaldsen (1770–1844), sculptor
 Jette Thyssen (born 1933), textile artist
 Elisabeth Toubro (1956–), sculptor
 Kurt Trampedach, painter
 Paula Trock (1889–1979), weaver, textile artist
 Lise Warburg (born 1932), textile artist and writer
 Gunnar Westman (1915–1985), sculptor
 Svend Wiig Hansen (1922–1997), sculptor and painter
 Johannes Wiedewelt (1731–1802), sculptor
 Christian Zacho (1843–1913), painter

Business people
 Birgit Aagard-Svendsen (1956–), CFO of J. Lauritzen
 Laura Aller (1849–1917), editor and pioneering magazine publisher at Aller
 Hans Niels Andersen (1852–1937), founder of the East Asiatic Company
 Dagmar Andreasen (1920–2006), ran the Rynkeby juice factory deom 1953 to 1986
 Irene Benneweis (1891–1970), circus director
 Lilly Brændgaard (1918–2009), fashion designer specializing in wedding dresses
 Constantin Brun (1746–1836), merchant, royal administrator of trade on the Danish West Indies
 Elsebeth Budolfsen (1947–), pharmacist and business executive
 Ole Kirk Christiansen (1891–1958), inventor of Lego
 Johan Frederik Classen (1725–1792), statesman and industrialist, founder of Frederiksværk
 Peter Hersleb Classen (1738–1825), statesman and financial administrator
 Mads Clausen, founder of Danfoss Industries
 Henriette Danneskiold-Samsøe (1776–1843), founder of the Holmegaard Glass Factory
 Janus Friis, Skype, Kazaa, Joost and minor companies
 Ole Henriksen (1951–), cosmetologist for Hollywood stars
 Søren Hjorth (1801–1870), inventor 
 Henning Holck-Larsen and Søren Kristian Toubro, founders of Indian engineering firm Larsen & Toubro
 J. C. Jacobsen (1811–1887), founder of Carlsberg Brewing
 Hanni Toosbuy Kasprzak (1957–), owner of the ECCO shoe company
 William S. Knudsen, industrialist; president, General Motors in the US
 Camilla Ley Valentin (1973–), entrepreneur and co-founder of Queue-it
 Martin Lindstrom (1970–), marketing advisor
 Arnold Peter Møller (1876–1965), founder of A.P. Møller-Mærsk Group, the largest Danish company
 Mærsk Mc-Kinney Møller (1913–2012), shipping magnate
 Nikoline Nielsen (1874–1951), brewer
 Inger Marie Plum (1889–1965), early businesswoman in butter and canned meat production
 Jørgen Skafte Rasmussen (1878–1964)
 Kevin Bendix (1968–) temporary urban culture developer
 Tine Susanne Miksch Roed (1964–), deputy director-general, Confederation of Danish Industry
 Frida Schou (1891–1980), early businesswoman and brick manufacturer
 Rasmus Sigvardt (1886–), engine manufacturer
 Nina Smith (born 1955), economist and university professor
 Carl Frederik Tietgen (1829–1901), financier and industrialist; co-founder of many large Danish companies
 Ane Mærsk Mc-Kinney Uggla (1948–), business executive, chair of the A.P. Møller Foundation
 Lillian von Kauffmann (1920–2016), businesswoman and property owner

Chefs and restaurateurs
 Sven and Lene Grønlykke
 Rasmus Kofoed (1974–)
 Claus Meyer (1963–)
 Michel Michaud (1946–), brought French cuisine to Denmark in 1971
 René Redzepi (1977–), chef, co-founder of Noma restaurant
 Lertchai Treetawatchaiwong
 Karen Volf (1864–1946), pioneering female baker and pastry cook

Comedians
 Anders Bircow, comedian, musician
 Rasmus Bjerg, comedian
 Victor Borge (1909–2000), comedian, musician
 Casper Christensen (1968–), comedian
 Drengene fra Angora, comedy trio 
 Thomas Eje, comedian, musician, touring in U.S. as Tom Dane
 Jan Gintberg (1963–), comedian
 Lars Hjortshøj (1967–), comedian
 Ane Høgsberg (born 1988), stand-up comedian
 Frank Hvam (1970–), comedian
 Rune Klan, comedian
 Simon Kvamm (1975–), comedian, musician
 Morten Lindberg, comedian also known as "Master Fatman"
 Anders Matthesen (1975–), comedian
 De Nattergale, comedy music trio
 Lasse Rimmer (1972–), comedian
 Sanne Søndergaard (born 1980), stand-up comedian and writer
 Sandi Toksvig, comedian in the UK
 Mads Vangsø, comedian

Criminals
 Peter Adler Alberti, abuse of power as Minister of Justice by impeachment and embezzlement
 Stein Bagger, the IT Factory Fraud Case
 The Blekinge Street Gang, robbery, financial aid to PFLP 
 Peter Brixtofte, abuse of power as Mayor of Farum
 Niels Holck, involved in illegal weapons supply in India
 Peter Lundin, four cases of murder
 Peter Langkjær Madsen, murder of journalist
 Erik Ninn-Hansen, abuse of power as Minister of Justice by impeachment
 Palle Sørensen, murder of four police officers

Dancers
 Frank Andersen (1953–), Royal Danish Ballet: ballet dancer and ballet master
 Mads Blangstrup (1974–), principal dancer, Royal Danish Ballet
 August Bournonville (1805–1879), ballet dancer and choreographer
 Gudrun Bojesen (1976–), principal dancer, Royal Danish Ballet
 Dinna Bjørn (1947–), principal dancer, ballet mistress, Royal Danish Ballet
 Marie Christine Bjørn (1763–1837), outstanding ballerina, Royal Danish Theatre
 Ida Brun (1792–1857), dancer, mime artist, singer
 Erik Bruhn (1929–1986), ballet dancer
 Lise la Cour (1944–2016), ballet dancer and choreographer
 Camilla Dallerup (1974–), British-based Danish ballroom dancer
 Vivi Flindt (1943–), choreographer, Royal Danish Ballet
 Anine Frölich (1762–1784), ballet dancer
 Adeline Genée (1878–1970), ballerina, Royal Danish Ballet; later music hall roles in London, New York and Sydney
 Lucile Grahn (1819–1907), ballerina, Royal Danish Ballet, performed widely across Europe
 Susanne Grinder (1981–), principal dancer, Royal Danish Ballet
 Eline Heger (1774–1842), ballet dancer, Royal Danish Ballet
 Else Højgaard (1906–1979), ballerina, stage and film actress, Royal Danish Theatre
 Mette Hønningen (1944–), ballerina, Royal Danish Ballet
 Nikolaj Hubbe (1967–), Royal Danish Ballet balletmaster and former New York City Ballet principal dancer
 Palle Jacobsen (1940–2009), ballet dancer and ballet master
 Caroline Kellermann (1821–1881), solo dancer in the Royal Danish Ballet
 Andrea Krætzmer (1811–1889), soloist in August Bournonville's early ballets
 Henning Kronstam (1934–1995), dancer, balletmaster, theatre director, Royal Danish Ballet
 Margot Lander (1910–1961), Denmark's first prima ballerina, Royal Danish Ballet
 Toni Lander (1931–1985), ballerina in Copenhagen, Paris, London and Salt Lake City
 Elna Lassen (1901–1930), ballerina, Royal Danish Ballet
 Gitte Lindstrøm (1975–), principal dancer, Royal Danish Ballet
 Nilas Martins, New York City Ballet principal dancer
 Peter Martins (1946–), New York City Ballet balletmaster in chief, choreographer and former ballet dancer
 Asta Mollerup (1881–1945), modern dance teacher and school director
 Augusta Nielsen (1822–1902), ballerina, soloist in Bournonville's ballets
 Elna Ørnberg (1880–1969), ballerina, soloist in Bournonville's ballets
 Ulla Poulsen (1905–2001), ballerina, Royal Danish Ballet
 Ellen Price (1878–1968), prima ballerina, Royal Danish Ballet
 Juliette Price (1831–1906), prima ballerina, Royal Danish Ballet, worked with Bournonville
 Kirsten Ralov (1922–1999), ballerina, ballet mistress, associate director, Royal Danish Ballet
 Louise Rasmussen (1815–1874), ballet dancer and stage actor, Royal Danish Ballet
 Margrethe Schall (1775–1852), ballerina, Royal Danish Ballet
 Silja Schandorff (1969–), ballerina, Royal Danish Ballet
 Kirsten Simone (1934–), first soloist Royal Danish Ballet
 Nini Theilade (1915–), ballet dancer, choreographer, film star
 Anna Tychsen (1863–1896), ballet dancer
 Valda Valkyrien (1895–1956), prima ballerina, Royal Danish Ballet, silent film actress in the United

Economists
 Tim Bollerslev (1958–), economist and professor at American institutions
 Ernst Immanuel Cohen Brandes (1844–1892), economist and editor
 Johan Christian Fabricius (1745–1808), economist and entomologist
 Bodil Nyboe Andersen (1940–), governor of the Danish National Bank from 1995 to 2005
 Bo Honoré (1960–), economist and professor at Princeton University
 Lasse Heje Pedersen (1972–), financial economist and professor at Copenhagen Business School

Explorers
 Vitus Bering (1680–1741)
 Hans Egede
 Carl Gunnar Feilberg (1894–1972), Iran
 Peter Freuchen (1886–1957), Greenland
 Thomas Vilhelm Garde (1859–1926), Greenland
 Wilhelm August Graah (1793–1863), Greenland
 Henning Haslund-Christensen (1896–1948), Mongolia
 Gustav Frederik Holm (1849–1940), Greenland
 Erik Holtved
 Carl Krebs (1889–1971), Central Asia
 Jochem Pietersen Kuyter (?–1654), seaman and early settler of New Netherland
 Godske Lindenov (?–1612), Greenland
 Conrad Malte-Brun (1755–1826), Danish-born French geographer
 Ejnar Mikkelsen (1880–1971), Greenland
 Harald Moltke (1871–1960), Greenland
 Jens Munk
 Ludvig Mylius-Erichsen (1872–1907), Greenland
 Ole Olufsen (1865–1929), Central Asia
 Didrik Pining (c. 1428–1491), Greenland
 Hans Pothorst (c. 1440–c. 1490), Greenland
 Knud Rasmussen (1879–1933), the Arctic
 Barclay Raunkiær (1889–1915), Arabia
 Carl Ryder (1858–1923), Greenland
 Peder Olsen Walløe (1716–1793), Greenland

Fictional Danes
 Dan I of Denmark, mythological first king of Denmark
 Frotho I, mythological king of Denmark (King Frodo I, see Fróði)
 Frotho II, mythological king of Denmark (King Frodo II, see Fróði)
 Dani Beck
 Beowulf
 King Claudius
 Holger Danske
 Gertrude
 King Hamlet
 Prince Hamlet
 Hans (Disney)
 The Little Mermaid 
 Skærmtrolden Hugo 
 Thumbelina
 Ragnar Lothbrok

Film directors

 Bille August (1948–), director
 Erik Balling (1924–2005), director
 Susanne Bier (1960–), director, writer
 August Blom (1869–1947), director, producer
 Ole Bornedal, director
 Carl Theodor Dreyer (1889–1968), film director (The Passion of Joan of Arc, Ordet)
 Peter Elfelt (1866–1931), photographer, silent film director
 Per Fly
 Bodil Ipsen (1889–1964), director, actress
 Anders Thomas Jensen
 Lau Lauritzen Jr. (1910–1977), director, actor, producer
 Jørgen Leth, filmmaker and poet
 Nils Malmros, filmmaker
 Nicolas Winding Refn, director
 Mikael Salomon, director, writer
 Lone Scherfig (1959–), director
 Lars von Trier (1956–), director
 Thomas Vinterberg (1969–), director

Gamers
 Søren Bjerg (1996–), League of Legends gamer for Team SoloMid
 Henrik Hansen, League of Legends gamer
 Nicolaj Jensen, League of Legends gamer for Cloud9
 Dennis Johnsen, League of Legends gamer for Cloud9
 Lucas Tao Kilmer Larsen, League of Legends gamer
 Chres Laursen, League of Legends gamer for Misfits Gaming
 Jesper Svenningsen (1997–), League of Legends gamer for Team SoloMid
 Nicolai Hvilshøj Reedtz, Counter Strike: Global Offensive gamer for Ninjas in Pyjamas
 Lukas Egholm Rossander, Counter Strike: Global Offensive gamer for Astralis
 Peter Rothmann Rasmussen, Counter Strike: Global Offensive gamer for Astralis
 Andreas Højsleth, Counter Strike: Global Offensive gamer for Astralis
 Emil Hoffmann Reif, Counter Strike: Global Offensive gamer for Astralis
 Johan Sundstein, Dota 2 gamer for OG, highest earning Esports player by pricepool

Historians
 Sven Aggesen (fl. 12th century), historian
 Ellen Andersen (1898–1989), museum curator, specializing in the history of textiles
 Kirsti Andersen (1941–), historian of mathematics
 Erik Arup (1876–1951), historian
 Tom Buk-Swienty (1966–), historian with a focus on the Second Schleswig War
 Tove Clemmensen (1915–2006) art historian and curator
 Kristian Erslev (1852–1930), historian and Historiographer
 Saxo Grammaticus (c. 1160–c. 1220), historian
 Ingeborg Hammer-Jensen (1880–1955), classical philologist and historian of alchemy
 Karin Hindsbo (1974–), art historian
 Anna Hude (1858–1934), first Danish woman to graduate as a historian
 Arild Huitfeldt (1546–1609), historian
 Adolf Ditlev Jørgensen (1840–1897), historian
 Maria Nielsen (1882–1931), historian and headmistress
 Louise Nyholm Kallestrup (1975–), historian with a focus on early modern history
 Bo Lidegaard (1958–), historian
 Troels Frederik Lund (1840–1921), historian
 Astrid Friis (1893–1966), historian focusing on 17th-century trade and commerce
 Elisabeth Munksgaard (1924–1997), historian and expert on art from the late Iron Age and Viking Age
 Niels Neergaard (1854–1936), historian
 Elise Otté (1818–1903), historian and linguist
 Else Roesdahl (1942–), historian and Viking specialist
 Bente Scavenius (1944–), art historian
 Else Kai Sass (1912–1987), art historian
 Peter Frederik Suhm (1728–1798), historian
 Per K. Sørensen (1950–), Tibetologist
 Stephanius (1599–1650), historian
 Anders Sørensen Vedel (1542–1616), historian
 Jens Jacob Asmussen Worsaae (1821–1885), archaeologist, historian and pioneer in paleobotany

Linguists
 Ada Adler (1878–1946)
 Una Canger, linguist
 Christian Falster (1690–1752), poet and philologist
 Louis Hjelmslev (1899–1955)
 Eli Fischer-Jørgensen (1911–2010), phonetician
 Frede Jensen (1926–2008), philologist and professor
 Otto Jespersen (1860–1943)
 Johan Nicolai Madvig (1804–1886)
 Axel Olrik (1864–1917)
 Holger Pedersen (1867–1953), linguist
 Rasmus Rask, linguist
 Jørgen Rischel, linguist
 Kim Ryholt, philologist and egyptologist
 Vilhelm Thomsen (1842–1927)
 Karl Verner (1846–1896), linguist

Models
 Nina Agdal, model
 Heidi Albertsen, model
 May Andersen, model
 Anine Bing, model
 Oliver Bjerrehuus, model
 Helena Christensen, model
 Kira Eggers, adult model
 Freja Beha Erichsen, model
 Maria Gregersen, model
 Gitte Hanspal, model
 Majken Haugedal, model
 Katja K, pornstar
 Mathias Lauridsen, male model
 Renée Simonsen, model
 Josephine Skriver, model
 Elsa Sørensen, model
 Tania Strecker, model
 Catharina Svensson, model, Miss Earth 2001
 Cecilie Thomsen, model, appeared in Tomorrow Never Dies

Music

A
 Afenginn
 Alphabeat
 Aqua, peaked in 1997 with "Barbie Girl"
 Artillery
 Signe Asmussen (1970–), mezzo-soprano
 Christina Åstrand (1969–), violinist, leader of the Danish National Symphony Orchestra

B
 Lisbeth Balslev, operatic soprano
 Ellen Beck (1873–1953), soprano concert singer
 Bamses Venner
 Julie Berthelsen, singer
 Bikstok Røgsystem
 Birmingham 6
 The Blue Van
 Helene Blum (1979–), folk singer and musician
 Henriette Bonde-Hansen (1963–), operatic soprano
 Dagmar Borup (1867–1959), pianist and educator
 Brixx
 Gunna Breuning-Storm (1891–1966), violinist, educator
 Gerda von Bülow (1904–1990), violinist, educator
 Dieterich Buxtehude (1637–1707), composer

C
 C21
 Debbie Cameron
 Carpark North
 The Cartoons
 Tim Christensen
 Ida Corr

D
 D-A-D
 Anna David
 Daze
 Emmelie de Forest, winner of Eurovision Song Contest 2013
 Lonnie Devantier
 Tina Dickow, singer
 Tina Dico
 René Dif, singer, member of Aqua
 Dizzy Mizz Lizzy
 DJ Encore
 Dominus
 Elisabeth Dons (1864–1942), opera singer
 DQ

E
 Efterklang
 Amir El-Falaki
 Michael Elo, composer
 Evil Masquerade

F

 Bent Fabricius-Bjerre
 Fate
 Fielfraz
 Figurines
 Sharin Foo
 Anders Frandsen
 Lars Frederiksen, vocalist of Rancid

G
 Jacob Gade
 Niels W. Gade
 Gangway
 Gasolin'
 Susanne Georgi, one half of Me & My
 Leocadie Gerlach (1826–1919), Danish-Swedish opera singer 
 Lukas Graham 
 Peder Gram (1881–1956), composer
 Edith Guillaume (1943–2013), mezzo-soprano opera singer

H
 Golla Hammerich (1854–1903), pianist
 Lars Hannibal (1951–), guitarist and lutenist
 Hatesphere
 Caroline Henderson
 Hit'n'Hide
 Horrorpops
 Hot Eyes
 Hurdy Gurdy
 Húsakórið, Faroese/Danish

I
 Illdisposed
 Infernal
 Grethe Ingmann
 Jørgen Ingmann

J
 Louise Janssen (1863–1938), opera singer
 Knud Jeppesen (1892–1974)
 Jokeren
 Junior Senior

K
 Kashmir
 Sophie Keller (1850–1929), opera singer
 King Diamond (1956–)
 Birthe Kjær
 Kliché
 Klutæ
 Kølig Kaj

L
 Laban
 Laid Back
 Kim Larsen (1945–2018)
 Jeppe Laursen
 Lazyboy
 Margrethe Lendrop (1873–1920), opera singer
 Rasmus Lerdorf
 Leæther Strip
 Anne Linnet
 Hans Christian Lumbye

M

 Frederik Magle
 Malk de Koijn
 Manticora
 Mames Babegenush
 MC Einar, rap band
 Me & My
 Medina
 Mercenary
 Mercyful Fate
 Mew
 Michael Learns to Rock
 Ulla Miilmann (1972–), flautist
 Christine Milton
 Anila Mirza (1974–), singer
 MØ (1988–), pop singer
 Ida Møller (1872–1947), opera singer
 Miss Papaya
 Mnemic
 Mofus
 John Mogensen
 Malene Mortensen

N
 The Naked
 Nanna
 Natasja Saad
 Nekromantix
 Nephew
 New Politics
 Amanda Nielsen (1866–1953), cabaret singer
 Carl Nielsen (1865–1931), composer
 Inga Nielsen (1946–2008), soprano
 Ida Nielsen (Prince), bassist
 Nik og Jay
 Eva Noer Kondrup (1964–), composer
 Claus Norreen, composer
 Rasmus Nøhr
 Per Nørgård

O
 Edith Oldrup, opera singer 
 Oh No Ono
 Olsen Brothers
 Outlandish
 Aage Oxenvad (1884–1944), clarinetist

P
 Else Paaske (1941–), mezzo-soprano concert singer
 Parzival
 Niels-Henning Ørsted Pedersen, jazz bass player
 Michala Petri (1958–), recorder player
 Pretty Maids
 Psyched Up Janis
 Pyramaze

R
 Lina Rafn
 Wilhelm Ramsøe (1837–1895), composer
 Søren Nystrøm Rasted, composer
 Raunchy
 The Raveonettes
 Simon Ravn, film composer
 Remee, composer
 Bryan Rice
 Ridin' Thumb
 Rollo & King
 Rune RK

S
 Safri Duo
 Soluna Samay
 Louise Sahlgreen (1818–1891), opera singer
 Sanne Salomonsen
 Savage Rose
 Saybia
 Sebastian
 Rasmus Seebach
 Tommy Seebach
 Sidsel Ben Semmane
 Shu-Bi-Dua
 Catharine Simonsen (1816–1849), opera singer
 S.O.A.P.
 Sort Sol
 Spleen United
 Simon Steen-Andersen, composer
 Johanne Stockmarr (1869–1944), classical pianist
 Superheroes
 Jakob Sveistrup
 Bent Sørensen

T
 Tiggy
 Jette Torp
 Toy-Box
 Mike Tramp (1961–), singer in White Lion
 Trentemøller
 Trille (1945–2016), singer-songwriter
 Thomas Troelsen
 TV-2

U
 Lars Ulrich (1963–), drummer in Metallica
 Under byen

V
 Esther Vagning (1905–1986), classical concert pianist
 Volbeat (band)
 Vola (progressive rock band)

W

 Sune Rose Wagner
 Galina Werschenska (1906–1994), Russian-born Danish pianist
 Christopher Ernst Friedrich Weyse
 Whigfield
 Birthe Wilke
 Gustav Winckler
 Lars Winther

Z
 Josephine Zinck (1829–1919), concert and opera singer

Philanthropists
 Mimi Carstensen (1852–1935), philanthropist and journalist
 Valborg Hammerich (1897–1988), resistance member and founder of "Red Barnet"
 Kirsten Lauritzen (1902–1980), helped needy children and the elderly
 Camilla Nielsen (1856–1932), philanthropist and politician
 Julie Ramsing (1871–1954), organized trips to Denmark for malnourished German children
 Lucie Marie Reventlow (1884–1894), philanthropist, supporter of the scouting movement

Philosophers
 N. F. S. Grundtvig (1783–1872), educationalist, philosopher and social reformer
 Harald Høffding (1843–1931)
 Søren Kierkegaard (1813–1855), philosopher
 Knud Ejler Løgstrup (1905–1981), Christian philosopher
 Rasmus Nielsen (1809–1884)
 Johannes Sløk (1916–2001), Christian philosopher and translator of Shakespeare
 Martinus Thomsen (1890–1981), referred to as Martinus, writer and mystic

Photographers

 Mads Alstrup (1808–1876), first Danish photographer with own studio
 Per Bak Jensen (1949–), influential photographer with an innovative artistic landscape style
 Morten Bo (1945–), influential photographer, author of many photo books
 Pietro Boyesen (1819–1882), photographer in Rome
 Krass Clement (1946–), specializing in the photo-essay style
 Peter Faber (1810–1877), took oldest photo on record
 Frederikke Federspiel (1839–1913), first female photographer to practice in Denmark
 Kristen Feilberg (1839–1919), remembered for many early photographs in Dutch East Indies
 Jens Fink-Jensen (1956–), contemporary artistic photographer
 Jan Grarup (1968–), award-winning press photographer specializing in war and conflict
 Ludvig Grundtvig (1836–1901), photographer and portrait painter
 Caroline Hammer (1832–1915), early woman photographer with a studio on the Frisian island of Föhr
 Georg Emil Hansen (1833–1891), pioneering court photographer
 Christian Hedemann (1852–1932), remembered for his early photographs of Hawaii
 Keld Helmer-Petersen (1920–2013), pioneer in colour photography in the 1940s
 Jacob Holdt (1947–), used photography to encourage social reform
 Jesper Høm (1931–2000), influential press photographer and film director
 Kirsten Klein (1945–), specializing in black-and-white landscapes
 Astrid Kruse Jensen (1975–), specializing in night photography with an unreal dimension 
 Claus Bjørn Larsen (1963–), award-winning press photographer
 Anton Melbye (1818–1875), artist using photography as an aid to painting
 Israel B. Melchior (1827–1893), amateur photographer who photographed Hans Christian Andersen
 Rigmor Mydtskov (1925–2010), theatre photography and court photographer for Queen Margrethe
 Viggo Rivad (1922–2016), used photographic essays to portray ordinary citizens
 Leif Schiller (1939–2007), photographer
 Lars Schwander (1957–), portraits of international artists
 Jacob Aue Sobol (1976–), award-winning collections from Greenland, Guatemala and Tokyo
 Mary Steen (1856–1939), pioneer of indoor photography, including royalty
 Rudolph Striegler (1816–1876), pioneering portrait photography
 Heinrich Tønnies (1825–1903), early studio in Aalborg, portraits and landscapes
 Sigvart Werner (1872–1959), amateur who gained fame from Danish landscapes in book form
 Mary Willumsen (1884–1961), sold postcards of scantily-dressed women from 1916
 Benedicte Wrensted (1859–1949), took photographs of Native Americans in Idaho

Politicians
 Frank Aaen (born 1951), politician (Enhedslisten) 
 Yildiz Akdogan, politician (Social Democrats)
 Ragnhild Andersen (1907–1990), politician and trade unionist (Communist Party)
 Karen Ankersted (1859–1921), pioneering female politician (Conservative People's Party)
 Svend Auken (1943–2009), politician (Social Democrats)
 Bendt Bendtsen, politician (Konservative Folkeparti)
 Klaus Bondam, politician, actor (Det Radikale Venstre)
 Vilhelm Buhl, politician, Danish prime minister 1942 & 1945 (Social Democrats)
 Marie Chistensen (1860–1935), one of the first five women to be elected to the Landsting in 1918
 Henriette Crone (1874–1933), Landsting politician, trade unionist, peace activist
 Kristian Thulesen Dahl, politician (Dansk Folkeparti)
 Marie Egeberg (1865–1952), schoolteacher, women's rights activist and Ventre politician
 Erik Eriksen
 Lene Espersen, politician (Konservative Folkeparti)
 Jacob Brønnum Scavenius Estrup (1825–1913), Council President
 Mette Frederiksen, politician (Social Democrats)
 Louise Frevert, politician (no political party)
 Lis Groes (1910–1974), politician (Social Democrats) and feminist
 Hans Christian Hansen
 Hans Hedtoft
 Lisbet Hindsgaul (1890–1969), politician (Conservative People's Party) and women's rights activist
 Frode Jakobsen, WWII in the resistance movement, member of the Danish Freedom Council, politician (Social Democrats)
 Marianne Jelved, politician (Det Radikale Venstre)
 Frank Jensen, politician (Social Democrats), Lord Mayor of Copenhagen
 Anker Jørgensen, politician, Danish prime minister 1972–1973 & 1975–1982 (Social Democrats)
 Viggo Kampmann
 Naser Khader, politician (Konservative Folkeparti)
 Pia Kjærsgaard, politician (Dansk Folkeparti)
 Jens Otto Krag, former prime minister
 Knud Kristensen
 Edele Kruchow, member of the Folketing, served on Denmark's delegation to the United Nations
 Camma Larsen-Ledet (1915–1991), politician, minister and mayor (Social Democrats)
 Helga Larsen (1884–1947), one of the first four women to be elected to the Folketing
 Mogens Lykketoft, politician (Social Democrats)
 Eva Madsen (1884–1972), Denmark's first female mayor
 Brian Mikkelsen, politician (Konservative Folkeparti)
 Per Stig Møller, politician (Konservative Folkeparti)
 Poul Møller, politician, minister of Finance 1968–1971, member of the European Parliament 1979–1986 (Konservative Folkeparti)
 Holger K. Nielsen, politician (Socialistisk Folkeparti)
 Elisa Petersen, early female politician (Venstre) and women's rights activist
 Petra Petersen (1901–1989), politician and resistance fighter
 Søren Pape Poulsen, politician (Konservative Folkeparti)
 Anders Fogh Rasmussen, Danish prime minister 2001–2009 (Venstre)
 Lars Løkke Rasmussen, politician, Danish prime minister 2009–2011 (Venstre)
 Poul Nyrup Rasmussen, politician, Danish prime minister 1993–2001 (Social Democrats)
 Pernille Rosenkrantz-Theil, politician (Social Democrats)
 Erik Scavenius, Danish prime minister 1943(–1945)
 Poul Schlüter, politician, Danish prime minister 1982–1993 (Konservative Folkeparti)
 Johanne Schmidt-Nielsen, politician (Enhedslisten)
 Johnny Søtrup (Venstre), mayor of Esbjerg (1994–2017)
 Erna Sørensen (1896–1980), (Conservative People's Party)
 Villy Søvndal, politician (Socialistisk Folkeparti)
 Thorvald Stauning, politician, Danish prime minister 1924–1926 & 1929–1942 (Social Democrats)
 Helle Thorning-Schmidt, politician, Danish prime minister 2011–2015 (Social Democrats)
 Margrethe Vestager, politician (Det Radikale Venstre)
 Anna Westergaard (1882–1964), railway official, trade unionist, women's rights activist, politician (Social Liberal Party)

Religion
 Absalon (c. 1128–1201), bishop of Roskilde (1158–1192), archbishop of Lund (1178–1201)
 Johanne Andersen, one of the first three women to be ordained as priests of the Church of Denmark
 Henning Toft Bro (1956–), bishop of Aalborg
 Hans Adolph Brorson (1694–1764), pietist and hymn writer, bishop of Ribe (1741–1764)
 Jacob Dacian, 16th-century Franciscan missionary to Mexico
 Karen Horsens (1932–), first female minister of the Church of Denmark to become a dean
 Thomas Kingo (1634–1703), poet and hymn writer, bishop of Funen (1677–1703)
 Czeslaw Kozon (1951–), Roman Catholic bishop of the Diocese of Copenhagen
 Stygge Krumpen (c. 1485–1551), last catholic bishop in Denmark (before the Lutheran reformation)
 Hans Ludvig Martensen (1927–2012), bishop of the Roman Catholic Diocese of Copenhagen (1965–1995)
 Bent Melchior (1929–), chief rabbi of Denmark (1969–1996)
 Knut Ansgar Nelson (1906–1990), Roman Catholic bishop of Stockholm (1957–1962)
 Peder Palladius (1503–1560), Lutheran reformator, bishop of Zealand (1537–1560)
 Edith Brenneche Petersen (1896–1973), one of the first three women to be ordained as Church of Denmark priests
 Kirsten Stoffregen Petersen (1932–2017), nun, theologian, iconographer
 Lise-Lotte Rebel (1951–), first woman to become a bishop in the Church of Denmark (1995)
 Hans Svane (1634–1703), bishop of Zealand (1655–1668), archbishop (1660–1668)
 Hans Tausen (1494–1561), Lutheran reformator, bishop of Ribe (1542–1561) 
 Ruth Vermehren (1894–1983), one of the Church of Denmark's first three women priests

Royalty

Danish monarchs 

 Abel
 Canute the Great, King of England, Denmark and Norway
 Canute III
 Canute IV
 Canute V
 Canute VI
 Christian I
 Christian II, last king of the Kalmar Union
 Christian III
 Christian IV
 Christian V
 Christian VI
 Christian VII
 Christian VIII
 Christian IX, king known as the "Father-in-law of Europe"
 Christian X, king during German occupation
 Christopher I
 Christopher II
 Christopher of Bavaria
 Eric I
 Eric II
 Eric III
 Eric IV
 Eric V
 Eric VI
 Eric of Pomerania, crowned king of the Kalmar Union 1397
 Eric Christoffersen
 Frederick I
 Frederick II
 Frederick III
 Frederick IV
 Frederick V
 Frederick VI
 Frederick VII
 Frederick VIII
 Frederick IX
 Gorm the Old
 Gnupa
 Gyrd
 Gøtrik, challenged Charlemagne in 810
 Harald
 Harald Klak
 Harald Bluetooth
 Harald II
 Harald III
 Harald Kesja
 Harthacnut (I)
 Helge
 Hemming
 Horik I
 Horik II
 John
 Magnus the Good
 Magnus the Strong
 Margrethe I (1353–1412), unified the Scandinavian countries
 Margrethe II (1940–), also a writer, painter, translator and illustrator of books
 Niels
 Olof
 Oluf I
 Oluf II
 Oluf (II) Haraldsen
 Ongendus, first historical Danish king
 Reginfrid
 Sigfred
 Sigfred & Halfdan
 Sigtrygg
 Sweyn I, King of Denmark, Norway and England
 Sweyn II
 Sweyn III
 Toke Gormsson, king of Scania
 Valdemar I
 Valdemar II
 Valdemar III
 Valdemar IV Atterdag
 Valdemar the Young

Other Danish royalty 
 Asfrid ( –  930s – ), Queen of Denmark, wife of Gnupa 
 Thyra (? – 958(?)), Queen of Denmark (930s–958(?)), wife of Gorm the Old
 Margareta Hasbjörnsdatter, Queen of Denmark (1076–1080), wife of Harald Hen
 Bodil, ( –1103), Queen of Denmark (1095–1103), wife of Eric I
 Sophie of Mecklenburg-Güstrow (1557–1631), Queen of Denmark and Norway (1572–1588), wife of Frederick II
 Anne Sophie (1693–1743), Queen of Denmark and Norway (1721–1730), wife of Frederick IV 
 Countess Danner (1815–1874), wife of Frederick VII
 Henrik, Prince Consort of Denmark (1934–2018), Prince Consort of Denmark
 Mary, Crown Princess of Denmark (1972–), Crown Princess of Denmark
 Princess Marie of Denmark (1976–), Princess of Denmark
 Prince Nikolai of Denmark (1999–)
 Prince Felix of Denmark (2002–)
 Prince Christian of Denmark (2005–)

Danes becoming kings or regents in other countries 
 George I
 Guthrum
 Harold Harefoot
 Haakon VII
 Johann (Prince)
 Magnus II
 Magnus of Livonia
 Olav V
 Rollo
 Svein Knutsson

Other foreign royalty 
 Alexandra of Denmark (1844–1925), Queen of the United Kingdom and Empress of India, daughter of Christian IX
 Anne of Denmark (1574–1619), Queen of Scotland, England and Ireland, daughter of Frederick II
 Queen Anne-Marie of Greece (1946–), daughter of Frederick IX
 Christina of Denmark (c. 1118–1139), Queen of Norway, daughter of Canute Lavard
 Christina of Denmark, Queen of Sweden, daughter of Bjørn Ironside
 George, Prince of Denmark (1653–1708), Duke of Cumberland, son of Frederick III
 Ingeborg of Denmark (1175–1238), Queen of France, daughter of Valdemar I
 Ingeborg of Denmark (c. 1244–1287), Queen of Norway, daughter of Eric IV
 Ingerid of Denmark, Queen of Norway, daughter of Sweyn II
 Margaret of Denmark (1456–1486), Queen of Scotland, daughter of Christian I
 Maria Feodorovna (1847–1928), Empress of Russia, daughter of Christian IX
 Martha of Denmark (1277–1341), Queen of Sweden, daughter of Eric V
 Richeza of Denmark (–1220), Queen of Sweden, daughter of Valdemar I
 Sophia of Denmark (1241–1286), Queen of Sweden, daughter of Eric IV
 Sophia Magdalena of Denmark (1746–1813), Queen of Sweden, daughter of Frederrick V
 Tyra of Denmark, Queen of Norway, daughter of Harald Bluetooth
 Ulrika Eleonora of Denmark (1656–1693), Queen of Sweden, daughter of Frederick III

Science and research
 Julie Arenholt (1873–1952), early female civil engineer, women's rights activist
 Heinrich Louis d'Arrest, Prussian astronomer, died in Copenhagen
 Ove Arup (1895–1988), Danish-born leading engineer, founder of Arup
 Caspar Bartholin the Elder (1585–1629)
 Caspar Bartholin the Younger (1655–1738)
 Rasmus Bartholin (1625–1698)
 Thomas Bartholin (1616–1680)
 Tove Birkelund (1928=1986), historical geologist
 Aage Bohr (1922–2009), physicist and Nobel Prize laureate
 Harald Bohr (1887–1951), mathematician
 Niels Bohr (1885–1962), physicist and Nobel Prize laureate
 Tycho Brahe (1546–1601), provided the observational data for Kepler's laws of planetary motion
 Johannes Nicolaus Brønsted (1879–1947)
 Karen Callisen (1882–1970), geologist
 Claudius Clavus (Claudius Claussøn Swart) (1388–?)
 Carl Peter Henrik Dam (1895–1976)
 Willi Dansgaard (1922–2011), geophysics
 Johan Ludvig Emil Dreyer (1852–1926), Danish-born astronomer
 A. K. Erlang, engineer, industrial and systems engineer
 Henning Frederik Feilberg (1831–1921), philologist, folklorist and writer
 Johannes Andreas Grib Fibiger, physician and Nobel Prize laureate
 Thomas Fincke (1561–1656), mathematician
 Niels Ryberg Finsen (1860–1904), physician and Nobel Prize laureate
 Bent Flyvbjerg, geographer and theorist of phronetic social science
 Anca Giurchescu (1930–2015), Romanian-born folk dance researcher and academic
 Hans Christian Gram (1853–1938), bacteriologist (gram staining)
 Jørgen Pedersen Gram
 Marie Hammer (1907–2002), zoologist
 Emil Christian Hansen (1842–1909), Saccharomyces carlsbergensis
 Peter Andreas Hansen (1795–1874)
 David Heinemeier Hansson, Ruby on Rails (lives in the US)
 Lene Hau (1959–), physicist and professor at Harvard University
 Piet Hein (1905–1996), poet and designer
 Anders Hejlsberg, Turbo Pascal, Delphi, C# (lives in the US)
 Ejnar Hertzsprung (1873–1967), astronomer
 Harald Hirschsprung (1830–1916), physician
 Niels Kaj Jerne, immunologist and Nobel Prize laureate
 Wilhelm Johannsen (1857–1927), coined the term "gene"
 Johannes Juul (1887–1969), inventor of wind turbines
 Jens Martin Knudsen (1930–2005)
 Evald Tang Kristensen (1843–1929), folklore collector
 Schack August Steenberg Krogh, physiologist and Nobel Prize laureate
 Niels A. Lassen, neuroimaging pioneer
 Inge Lehmann (1888–1993), seismologist (Earth's inner core)
 Rasmus Lerdorf, PHP (born in Greenland, lives in the US)
 Bergnart Carl Lewy (1817–1863), professor of chemistry
 Bodil Jerslev Lund (1919–2005), Danish chemist and pharmacist
 Peter Wilhelm Lund (1801–1880), paleontologist and zoologist, founder of Brazilian paleontology
 Conrad Malte-Brun (1775–1826)
 Georg Mohr (1640–1697), mathematician
 Peter Naur (1928–2016), Algol 60 and Backus-Naur form; Turing Award winner
 Ebbe Nielsen (1950–2001), entomologist
 Holger Bech Nielsen, physicist, co-inventor of string theory
 Jakob Nielsen (1890–1959), mathematician
 Jakob Nielsen (1957–), usability (lives in the US)
 Asger Skovgaard Ostenfeld (1866–1931), civil engineer
 Julius Petersen (1839–1910), mathematician
 Ragna Rask-Nielsen (1900–1998), biochemist
 Christen C. Raunkiær (1860–1938), ecologist and botanist, plant life-form
 Ole Rømer (1644–1710), first to calculate the speed of light
 Ozer Schild (1930–2006), Danish-born Israeli academic, President of the University of Haifa and President of the College of Judea and Samaria ("Ariel College").
 Johannes Schmidt
 Marianne Schroll (born 1942), geriatrician
 Heinrich Christian Friedrich Schumacher (1757–1830)
 Birte Siim (born 1945), political scientist specializing in gender studies
 Jens Christian Skou, chemist and Nobel Prize laureate 1997
 Nicolas Steno / Niels Stensen (1638–1686), geologist, anatomist
 Bjarne Stroustrup (1950–), C++ (lives in the US)
 Bengt Strömgren (1908–1987)
 Bent Erik Sørensen (1941–), physicist and researcher into renewable energy
 Søren Peder Lauritz Sørensen (1868–1939), chemist
 Thorvald Sørensen (1902–1973), botanist
 Thorvald N. Thiele (1883–1910), astronomer, actuary and mathematician, most notable for his work in statistics, interpolation and the three-body problem
 Christian Jürgensen Thomsen, archaeologist, inventor of the three-age system
 Bjarne Tromborg (1940–), physicist
 Eugen Warming (1841–1924), ecologist and botanist
 Caspar Wessel (1745–1818), Norwegian-Danish mathematician
 Jacob B. Winsløw (1669–1760)
 Ole Worm (1588–1654)
 Hans Christian Ørsted (1777–1851), physicist, discoverer of electromagnetism, speed of light
 Ida Ørskov (1922–2007), bacteriologist

Sports

Writers

 Hans Christian Andersen (1805–1875), Fairy Tales
 Hansine Andræ (1817–1898), feminist diarist
 Jens Immanuel Baggesen (1764–1826)
 Karen Blixen (aka Isak Dinesen) (1885–1962), author (Out of Africa, Seven Gothic Tales)
 Georg Brandes (1842–1927)
 Suzanne Brøgger (1944–), novelist and essayist
 Tove Ditlevsen (1918–1976), poet and author
 Bent Faurby (1937–), children's writer
 Kate Fleron (1909–2006), journal editor, resistance member
 Piet Hein (1905–1996)
 Dagmar Hjort (1860–1902), schoolteacher, writer and women's rights activist
 Peter Høeg (1957–), author
 Bernhard Severin Ingemann (1789–1862) novelist, poet and hymn writer
 FP Jac (1955–2008), poet
 Jens Peter Jacobsen (1847–1885), novelist (Niels Lyhne)
 Thit Jensen (1876–1957), writer and worker for women's suffrage
 Dorthe Jørgensen (1959–), philosopher and educator, first Danish woman to be awarded the honorary Dr.Phil
 Christian Jungersen (1962–)
 Hans Kirk (1898–1962), author
 Cornelia von Levetzow (1836–1921), popular novelist
 Hulda Lütken (1896–1946), poet and novelist
 Bodil Neergaard (1867–1959), estate owner, philanthropist, memoirist
 Martin Andersen Nexø (1869–1954), writer (Pelle, the Conqueror)
 Adam Gottlob Oehlenschläger (1779–1850)
 Henrik Pontoppidan, author and Nobel Prize laureate
 Jacob Riis (1849–1914), photographer, journalist and social activist in the US
 Edith Rode (1879–1956), novelist and journalist
 Alba Schwartz (1857–1942), novelist
 Ingeborg Maria Sick (1858–1951), novelist and biographer
 Tage Skou-Hansen (1925–), novels include De nøgne træer (The Naked Trees)
 Carl Erik Soya (1896–1993), author, playwright, poet, satirist
 Villy Sørensen (1929–2001), author
 Dan Turéll (1946–1993), author
 Fanny Tuxen (1832–1906), children's writer
 Johannes Østrup (1867–1938), philologist, educator, writer

Other notables
 Andreas Aagesen (1826–1879), jurist
 Jette Albinus (1966–), first female general in the Danish army
 Vibeke Ammundsen (1913–1988), librarian, head of Denmark's Technical Library
 Finn Andersen, Secretary General of Danish Cultural Institute
 Fredrik Bajer, writer, MP, peace researcher, Nobel Peace Prize Laureate 1908
 Anne Bruun (1853–1934), women's rights activist
 Biker-Jens, reality TV star
 Jutta Bojsen-Møller (1837–1927), high school proponent, women's rights activist
 Line Bonde (c.1979–), in 2006 first Danish woman to become a fighter pilot
 Aase Bredsdorff (1919–2017), Danish library inspector specialising in children's literature
 Ellen Johanne Broe (1900–1994), nurse and nursing educator
 Degn Brøndum (1856–1932), proprietor of Brøndums Hotel in Skagen frequented by the Skagen Painters
 Christine Buhl Andersen (born 1967), museum director
 Henrik Kurt Carlsen, sea captain
 Esther Carstensen (1873–1955), feminist, journal editor
 Ellen Christensen (1913–1998), nurse and resistance fighter
 B.S. Christiansen, Danish special force soldier, TV personality
 Louise Conring (1824–1891), first trained nurse in Denmark, head of Copenhagen's Deaconess Institute 
 Natasja Crone Back, journalist, host at the Eurovision Song Contest 2001
 Alma Dahlerup (1874–1969), Danish-American philanthropist
 Thomas Dam
 Thora Daugaard (1874–1951), women's rights activist and pacifist
 Bodil Dybdal (1901–1992), first woman to be appointed judge in the Supreme Court of Denmark
 Ragnhild Fabricius Gjellerup (1896–1958), Denmark's first female judge
 Anette Fischer (1946–1992), librarian and head of Amnesty International's International Board
 Nicolai Frahm, art advisor and collector
 Merete Gerlach-Nielsen (1933–2019), academic, UNESCO official, co-founder of KVINFO
 Anne Gøye (1609–1681), noblewoman, book collector
 Jutta Graae (1906–1997), Danish resistance fighter and archivist
 Gus Hansen, professional poker player
 Estrid Hein (1873–1956), ophthalmologist, women's rights activist and pacifist
 Ville Heise (1838–1912), philanthropist
 Birte Høeg Brask (1918–1997), Danish resistance fighter and psychiatrist
 Niels Ingwersen (1935–2009), promoter of Scandinavian literature and culture in the United States
 Ingrid Jespersen (1867–1938), pedagogue and school principal
 Karen Johnsen (1899–1990), high court judge 
 Jørgen Jørgensen, 19th-century adventurer famous for ruling Iceland for 2 months
 Katja Kean, former professional porn star; first Danish worldwide porn star
 Charlotte Klein (1834–1915), educator, art school principal and women's rights activist
 Nanna Kristensen-Randers (1864–1908), lawyer, folk school administrator
 Lars Kruse (1828–1894), Skagen fisherman and heroic lifesaver
 Marie Kruse (1842–1923), pioneering schoolteacher and girls school principal
 Anders Lassen, British Major, the only foreign soldier in the British forces in the Second World War to be awarded the Victoria Cross
 Lis Lauritzen, Cruise ship Captain
 Anna Laursen (1845–1911), educator and women's rights activist
 Rasmus Lerdorf, creator of PHP (Greenland)
 Bjørn Lomborg, skeptical environmentalist
 Henny Magnussen (1878–1937), lawyer
 Margrethe Marstrand (1874–1948), schoolteacher and writer, word-picture reading expert
 Ellen Marsvin (1572–1649), landowner and county administrator
 Lone Maslocha (1921–1945), resistance fighter
 Charlotte Munck (1876–1932), nurse, important figure in the training of nurses
 Flemming Muus, resistance fighter and author
 Jørgen de Mylius, TV and radio presenter
 Olivia Nielsen (1852–1910), women's trade unionist leader
 Benedict Nordentoft (1873–1942), Danish educator and cleric; co-founder of Solvang, California
 Charlotte Norrie (1855–1940), nursing campaigner and women's rights activist
 Knud Olsen, boat designer
 Camilla Ottesen, TV host
 Deepika Padukone (1986–), Danish-born Indian actress 
 Valdemar Poulsen (1869–1942), inventor of the tape recorder
 Gabriele Rohde (1904–1946), League of Nations official and member of the Danish Council in London in World War II
 Marie Rovsing (1814–1888), women's rights activist
 Søren Ryge Petersen (1945–), author, TV host
 Andrea Elisabeth Rudolph, radio and TV host
 Jette Sandahl (1949–), museum director
 Frida Schmidt (1849–1934), Danish women's rights activist and suffragist
 Marie Toft (1813–1854), landowner and religious revivalist, second wife of N.F.S. Grundtvig
 Lone Træholt (1958–), first female general in the Danish armed forces
 Clara Tybjerg (1864–1941), women's rights activist and pacifist
 Elisa Ussing (1885–1949), pioneering female lawyer and judge
 Martha Wærn (1741–1812), philanthropist
 Monica Wichfeld, entrepreneur and resistance fighter
 Sophie Zahrtmann (1841–1925), deaconess, nurse, head of Copenhagen's Deaconess Institute

See also
 List of Danish Americans
 List of Danish Jews
 List of Danish nurses

References

Citations